The American Music Award for Tour of the Year has been awarded since 2016. Years reflect the year in which the awards were presented, for works released in the previous year (until 2003 onward when awards were handed out in November of the same year). In 2022, the award's name became Favorite Touring Artist.

Winners and nominees

2010s

2020s

Category facts

Multiple nominations
 3 nominations
Ed Sheeran
 2 nominations
 Beyoncé
 Coldplay
 Elton John
 U2

References

American Music Awards
Awards established in 2016